The 2005–06 Slovak Cup  was the 37th season of Slovakia's annual knock-out cup competition and the thirteenth since the independence of Slovakia. It began on 2 August 2005 with Round 1 and ended on 8 May 2006 with the Final. The winners of the competition earned a place in the First qualifying round of the UEFA Cup. Dukla Banská Bystrica were the defending champions.

First round
The seven games were played on 2 August 2005 and the seven games were played on 3 August 2005.

|}

Second round
The four games were played on 30 August 2005 and the four games were played on 31 August 2005.

|}

Quarter-finals
The first legs were played on 18 October 2005 with the exception of Artmedia Bratislava – FC Senec, which was played on 5 October 2005. The second legs were played on 25 October 2005.

|}

Semi-finals
The first legs were played on 28 and 29 March 2006. The second legs were played on 11 and 12 April 2006.

|}

Final

References

External links
profutbal.sk 
Results on RSSSF

2006
Cup
Slovak Cup